Billy Jones (1935—2012) was an American-born artist and poet, who immigrated to Australia in 1967 and settled in Kilcoy, Queensland.

Personal life 
In 1968 Billy Jones met and fell in love with Diane Kelly. They moved together to Caloundra, Queensland and eventually settled at Mary Smokes Creek. Kelly died in a car accident in June 1975.
Early Influences:
this from an unpublished poem of Bill's:
                                 INFLUENCES
looking into the eyes
of squirrels in crotches
of boyhood trees alone
in the sanctuary woods
looked into the eyes of infinity
watching grandad draw birds
in Maple Street backyard
as he sipped straight whiskey
with jug of ice water chasers
hobo uncle Eddy who lacked nothing
finding Dostoevsky's CRIME AND PUNISHMENT
when I was an MP in the Marines in Japan
then discovering LEAVES OF GRASS
on a base library shelf, the wonder of Walt
my father dying in my arms on the kitchen floor
when we lived in Pasadena
& defacto Diane dead
in a drunken car crash in Woodford Queensland
where I ended up living like a hermit
in ragged tents on the riverbank
a friend giving me Buk's 
THE DAYS RUN AWAY LIKE WILD HORSES OVER THE HILLS
vacant lot sunflowers growing wild
just down the road in Pasadena
about the time I became aware
of Vincent Van Gogh
that same year living in 40 below Stockholm
working shit jobsto help support
a wife & baby then migrating to Oz
living with no fixed address for years
too poor to pay even the cheapest rent
these all spring to mind instantly
when I think of influences
things that made me
whatever I am
plus most of all perhaps realizing
when I was 5 walking home through a summer day
in the safety of the Clark Township
New Jersey woods & seeing a dead bluejay
and realizing that I would one day
that would be me

Works
Commencing shortly after Kelly's death in June 1975 and continuing until his own death in July 2012, Jones worked daily on his journal, in which he recorded observations and wrote poetry and sketches. He produced 167 volumes in total.

His published works include:
 Holocaust at Mary Smokes: poems 1975-83 (1983)
 The blue chair (1987)
 Backpocket poems (1988) 
 Wren Lines: Selected Poems and Drawings Volume 1 (2006)
 Crazy bone: poems & drawings (2012)

The UNSW Canberra Library at the Australian Defence Force Academy holds a large collection of Bill Jones's journals and personal papers.

The Fryer Library, University of Queensland Library holds a large collection of Billy Jones's journals and personal papers.

References

Australian artists
1935 births
2012 deaths
20th-century Australian poets
Australian male poets
20th-century Australian male writers